Vittert is a surname. Notable people with the surname include:

Leland Vittert (born 1982), American journalist and news presenter
Liberty Vittert, American statistician, political commentator, and television host

See also
Dittert